Journal of Lesbian Studies is a peer-reviewed interdisciplinary academic journal published by Taylor & Francis. It examines the cultural, historical, and interpersonal impact of the lesbian experience on society. The journal is a forum for research and theory, addressing the history, politics, science, race, literature, and life cycle issues of lesbians. It also carries book reviews related to lesbian studies. It was founded in 1997 by Haworth Press, who was acquired by Taylor & Francis in 2007.

See also
GLQ: A Journal of Lesbian and Gay Studies

References

Works about lesbians
LGBT-related journals
Sexology journals
Lesbian culture
Women's studies journals
Publications established in 1997